Kilby is both a surname and a given name. Notable people with the name include:

Surname:
 Arthur Forbes Gordon Kilby (1885–1915), English recipient of the Victoria Cross
 Barry Kilby, chairman of Burnley football club, England
 Brian Kilby (born 1938), British marathon runner
 Jack Kilby (1923–2005), American electrical engineer, inventor of the integrated circuit, and Nobel Laureate
 Richard Kilby (1560–1620), English scholar and priest
 Thomas Erby Kilby (1865–1943), Governor of Alabama, US
 Tommy Kilby (born 1964), American politician

Given name:
 Kilby MacDonald (1913–1986), hockey player
 Kilby Snow (1905–1980), American musician